Anthimus VI, (original name Joannides, 1782 – 7 December 1877) was the Ecumenical Patriarch of Constantinople for three periods from 1845 to 1848, from 1853 to 1855 and from 1871 to 1873. He was born in Kutali Island in the Sea of Marmara and died in Kandilli.

Before becoming a Patriarch, Anthimus was a monk at the Esphigmenou monastery in Mount Athos, and became metropolitan bishop of Serres (1829), Prussa (1833) and Ephesus (1837). In 1845, he expanded the catholicon of the monastery, adding two chapels, a vestibule and a porch to it.

1790 births
1878 deaths
Bishops of Ephesus
Eastern Orthodox Christians from Greece
Metropolitans of Bursa
19th-century Ecumenical Patriarchs of Constantinople
People associated with Esphigmenou Monastery